R. Balasubramaniam was an Indian actor whose career spanned from the late 1930s through late 1950s. He was well known for his role in mythological films and later switched to character roles.

Filmography

References

Male actors in Tamil cinema
Year of birth missing
Year of death missing